Jean Le Laboureur (1621 – June 26, 1675) was a French courtier, Roman Catholic clergyman and historian.

Early life
Jean Le Labourer was born in 1621 in Montmorency, Val-d'Oise, France. His paternal uncle, Claude Le Laboureur, was the provost of the Abbey of Île Barbe on the Île Barbe in Lyon and a book collector. His brother, Louis Le Laboureur, was a poet.

Le Laboureur was educated at the Couvent des Célestins in Paris.

Career
Le Laboureur was a courtier. In 1644, he assisted Jean-Baptiste Budes, Comte de Guébriant in his trip to Poland, where they took Marie Louise Gonzaga before her marriage to Władysław IV Vasa. A travel book about the trip authored by Le Laboureur was published posthumously, in 1697.

Le Laboureur served as a prior in Juvigné and Mayenne. He later served as chaplain and librarian to King Louis XIV of France. Additionally, he was the author of many books on French history.

Le Labourer was a Knight of the Order of Saint Michael.

Death
Le Laboureur died on 26 June 1675 in Montmorency, France.

Bibliography
Tombeau des personnes illustres dont les sépultures sont à l'église des Célestins de Paris (1641).
Relation du voyage de la Reine de Pologne, et du retour de Madame la Maréchale de Guébriant, ambassadrice extraordinaire (1647).
Histoire du Comte de Guébriant, Maréchal de France (1656).
Les Mémoires de Michel de Castelnau, Seigneur de Mauvissiere, contenant les choses remarquables qu'il a vues et négociées en France, en Angleterre, en Écosse sous les rois François II et Charles IX, depuis l'an 1559. jusqu'à l'août 1570 (1659).Histoire de Charles VI, roi de France, écrite par les ordres et sur les mémoires et les avis de Guy de Monceaux et de Philippes de Villette, abbés de Saint-Denis, par un auteur contemporain, religieux de leur abbaye [...] traduite sur le manuscrit latin tiré de la bibliothèque de M. le président de Thou [...] illustrée de plusieurs commentaires tirés de tous les originaux de ce règne [...]2, traduction française et commentaire (1663).Tableaux généalogiques des seize quartiers de nos rois depuis Saint Louis jusqu'à présent (1683).Discours de l'Origine des armoiries'' (1684).

References

1621 births
1675 deaths
People from Val-d'Oise
French courtiers
17th-century French Roman Catholic priests
17th-century French historians
17th-century French writers
17th-century male writers
Court of Louis XIV